P. J. Ryan (born 1977) is an Irish hurler.

P. J. Ryan may also refer to:

P. J. Ryan (Tipperary hurler) (born 1946), Irish hurler
P. J. Ryan Sr. (born 1952), Irish hurler